Eggendorf may refer to the following places in Austria:

Eggendorf, Lower Austria, in the district of Wiener Neustadt-Land, Lower Austria
Eggendorf im Traunkreis, Upper Austria
Eggendorf (Sankt Pölten), a part of Sankt Pölten, Upper Austria
Eggendorf Castle, near Eggendorf im Traunkreis.